Fourways Mall is a shopping mall in South Africa located in the Fourways area of Sandton, in suburban Johannesburg. It doubled its size, from 85,000m² to 178,000m², relaunching in 2019

The shopping mall consists of over 400 stores, a two-level food court, a massive open-air exhibition arena, an entertainment area (including movie theatres, a sizeable outdoor mini golf course and Bounce), various restaurants and 8000 parking bays.

Notable Events

Stranger Things Experience 

From 16 June 2022 to 19 June 2022, Netflix South Africa partnered with Fourways Mall to operate the Stranger Things Experience. The Experience previously operated at the Canal Walk Mall in Cape Town.

Tenants 

Its key retailers include Pick 'n Pay, Checkers Hyper, Food Lover's Market, West Pack, Game, Edgars, Woolworths, @Home, Loads of Living, Dischem, Clicks, The Body Shop, Exclusive Books, The Lindt Shop, Starbucks, Nespresso, Jeep, Typo, Cotton On, Columbia, Estoril Books, Diesel, Armani, Foschni, Guess, H&M, Hurley, Jet, Jockey, Lacoste, Markham, Truworths, Incredible Connection, Miladys, Levis, Mr Price, Mr Price Home, Polo, Police, Pringle of Scotland, Refinery, Quicksilver, Uzzi, Super Dry, Vans, Nike, Adidas, Sunglasses Hut, Kiehl's, Dermalogica, Leroy Merlin, Le Creuset, Swarovski, Hamleys, Toys R Us, Samsonite, HP, Matrix Warehouse, BT Games, The Fun Company, Ster-Kinekor, Lego Store, Cape Union Mart, Le Coq Sportif, New Balance, Puma and Under Armour.

The mall also hosts over 30 fast food and restaurant options, all major banks including FNB, Nedbank, Standard Bank, Absa, Capitec Bank and others, as well as all key cellular stores like iStore, MTN, Cell C, Telkom and Vodacom

References

External links 
 

Shopping centres in Johannesburg
Johannesburg Region E